The Metropolitan Borough of Kensington was a Metropolitan borough in the County of London from 1900 to 1965, which since 1901 was known as the Royal Borough of Kensington, following the death of Queen Victoria, in accordance with her wishes.

History
It bordered Chelsea, Fulham, Hammersmith, Paddington, and Westminster.

It included Kensington, South Kensington, Earls Court, Notting Hill, Brompton and part of Kensal Green.

In 1901 it was granted the status of a royal borough, and therefore from then was also known as the Royal Borough of Kensington. The status was granted after the death of Queen Victoria, in accordance with her wish (she was born at Kensington Palace in the borough).

In 1965 it was amalgamated with the Metropolitan Borough of Chelsea to form the Royal Borough of Kensington and Chelsea.

A number of street signs in the area still bear the designation "Royal Borough of Kensington".

The old Town Hall was demolished "in controversial circumstances" involving an impending conservation order in June 1982.

Coat of arms
The coat of arms is derived from those of the former Lords of the Manor, and that of the parish church, which is dedicated to the Virgin Mary.

Population and area
The Kensington borough covered  once part of Kensal New Town (a detached part of Chelsea before 1901) became incorporated. The population of Kensington recorded in the Census, which excludes Kensal New Town before 1901, was:

Kensington Vestry 1801–1899

Metropolitan Borough 1900–1961

Politics

Under the Metropolis Management Act 1855 any parish that exceeded 2,000 ratepayers was to be divided into wards; however the parish of St Mary Abbots Kensington had already been divided into three wards by a local act in 1851 - "The Kensington Improvement Act, 1851". So the incorporated vestry inherited these wards and assigned vestrymen to them: The Holy Trinity Brompton (27), St John's Notting Hill & St James' Norland (27) and St Mary Abbots (30).

In 1894 as its population had increased the incorporated vestry was re-divided into eight wards (electing vestrymen): Golborne (18), Norland (15), Pembridge (15), Holland (15), Earl's Court (12), Queen's Gate (15), Redcliffe (15) and Brompton (15).

The metropolitan borough was divided into nine wards for elections: Brompton, Earl's Court, Golborne, Holland, Norland, Pembridge, Queen's Gate, Redcliffe and St Charles.

Borough council

Parliament constituency
For elections to Parliament, the borough was divided into two constituencies:
Kensington North
Kensington South
In 1950 the borough's representation was increased to two and a half seats, when part of it was merged with Chelsea:
Chelsea
Kensington North
Kensington South
In 2010, the constituencies of Kensington North and South were merged to create a single constituency once again and Chelsea was branched off to create a new constituency.
Kensington
Chelsea and Fulham

References

Further reading
 

Metropolitan boroughs of the County of London
History of the Royal Borough of Kensington and Chelsea
1900 establishments in the United Kingdom
1965 disestablishments in the United Kingdom
Places with royal patronage in London
Districts abolished by the London Government Act 1963
Metropolitan Borough of